Adina trichotoma is a species of flowering plant in the family Rubiaceae.  It was first described by Heinrich Zollinger and Alexandre Moritzi in 1846.

This tree is found throughout Indochina: in Vietnamese it is called vàng vé (sometimes gáo long).

References

Naucleeae
Flora of Vietnam